Marcelina Klaudia Witek (born 2 June 1995) is a Polish track and field athlete who competes in the javelin throw. Her personal best is 66.53 m, set in 2018. She represented her country at the 2017 World Championships without qualifying for the final. In addition, she won a bronze medal at the 2017 European U23 Championships and a gold at the 2017 Summer Universiade.

International competitions

References

External links 

1995 births
Living people
Polish female javelin throwers
Sportspeople from Słupsk
World Athletics Championships athletes for Poland
Universiade medalists in athletics (track and field)
Universiade gold medalists for Poland
Polish Athletics Championships winners
Medalists at the 2017 Summer Universiade
21st-century Polish women